Topaze is a 1933 French comedy film directed by Louis J. Gasnier and starring Louis Jouvet, Simone Héliard and Marcel Vallée. It is based on the 1928 play Topaze by Marcel Pagnol. The same year, an American version of the play Topaze was released, starring John Barrymore. In 1936, Pagnol himself remade the film in France.

It was made at the Joinville Studios in Paris by the French subsidiary of Paramount Pictures. The film's sets were designed by the art director René Renoux.

Synopsis
An earnest schoolteacher who teaches his pupils that honesty is the best policy eventually changes his mind when confronted with the corruption of the business world.

Cast
 Louis Jouvet as Albert Topaze  
 Simone Héliard as Ernestine  
 Marcel Vallée as Muche  
 Jane Loury as Baronne Pitart Vergolles  
 Maurice Rémy as Roger de Tréville  
 Pierre Larquey as Tamise  
 Edwige Feuillère as Suzy Courtois  
 Camille Beuve as Le mâitre-chanteur  
Henri Vilbert as Un agent de police  
 Micheline Bernard 
 Jacqueline Delubac 
 Raymonde Debrennes

References

Bibliography
 Goble, Alan. The Complete Index to Literary Sources in Film. Walter de Gruyter, 1999.

External links 
 

1933 films
French comedy films
1930s French-language films
1933 comedy films
Films directed by Louis J. Gasnier
Films set in Paris
French films based on plays
Films based on works by Marcel Pagnol
Films shot at Joinville Studios
Paramount Pictures films
French black-and-white films
1930s French films